Lussac is a commune in the Charente-Maritime department in the Nouvelle-Aquitaine region in southwestern France. It is the least populated commune in the canton of Jonzac.

Geography
The village lies above the right bank of the Seugne, which forms most of the commune's western border.

Population

See also
 Communes of the Charente-Maritime department

References

External links
 

Communes of Charente-Maritime
Charente-Maritime communes articles needing translation from French Wikipedia